Outburn is a print magazine and online publication focusing on alternative rock, heavy metal, punk rock, indie rock, and other genres. It presents news on bands, music releases, and events, in-depth interviews, high-quality studio and live photography, and music reviews. From March 2018 to March 2021, the print magazine was on hiatus. In April 2021, Outburn resumed publication of the print magazine, beginning with issue #93.

History
Outburn is an independently owned music magazine and online website. Founded in 1996 by Rodney Kusano, Outburn grew from a DIY fanzine into a recognized and respected music publication.

publisher + editor + creative director: Rodney Kusano

editor-in-chief: Jeremy Saffer

writers: Brian Campbell, Joe Daly, Anabel DFlux, Anthony Frisketti, Stephanie Jensen, Nathan Katsiaficas, Jameson Ketchem, George Pacheco, Kelley Simms, Kevin Stewart-Panko, Jeff Treppel

photographers: Anabel DFlux, Anthony Frisketti, Jeremy Saffer

References

External links 
 

Bimonthly magazines published in the United States
Online music magazines published in the United States
Magazines established in 1996
Magazines published in California